Giovanny Romero Infante, also known as Gio Infante, (18 September 1988 – 24 January 2020) was a Peruvian journalist and LGBT activist.

Infante was well known, from Peru to the United States, for his advocacy on behalf of sexual minorities. Infante was the executive director of the Homosexual Movement of Lima.

See also
LGBT rights in Peru

References

1988 births
2020 deaths
Peruvian activists
Peruvian journalists
Male journalists
LGBT rights activists
Place of birth missing
Place of death missing